Vladimir Viardo (born 1949 in Krasnaya Polyana, Soviet Union), is a Russian pianist.

Career
The first steps in music were taken with his mother, the classical singer, voice teacher and pianist Nathalia Viardo.

Viardo studied with Irina Naumova at the Gnessin State Musical College and later studied with Lev Naumov at the Moscow Conservatory, where he remained as a student for six years. Naumov would describe him as "my number one pupil". During this time, he was tenured as a soloist by Moscow Philharmonia (the primary music organization of the USSR). After obtaining a doctorate, he was immediately engaged as assistant professor with Naumov at the Conservatory. At the age of 21 Viardo took the third prize and the Prix du Prince Rainier at the Marguerite Long-Jacques Thibaud Competition, and in 1973 first prize at the Van Cliburn International Competition. He had already launched an impressive world career when his travel visa was mysteriously revoked. For nearly thirteen years, Viardo was a virtual prisoner behind the Iron Curtain. During this period, he developed new horizons, vastly enlarging his repertoire, eventually including 37 concertos. Only when Mikhail Gorbachev rose to power in the Soviet Union the freedom to travel was restored, and in 1987 Viardo was permitted to accept engagements in Germany and in the United States.

He joined the University of North Texas College of Music faculty as artist-in-residence in 1989. His international roster of students includes young artists from Eastern Europe, as well as Portugal, Spain, Mexico, South Africa and the United States. Viardo's master classes are much in demand throughout the world and his name appears in the book The Most Wanted Piano Teachers in the USA.

Since returning to the West where his international career resumed with several concerts at Carnegie Hall, the Lincoln and Kennedy Centers, Salle Pleyel and the Concertgebouw, Viardo's tours have taken him to American, Canadian and European cities, Asia and South Africa as well as to Israel, Central and South America, appearing as soloist with conductors such as Lorin Maazel, Zubin Mehta, Vladimir Spivakov, Dmitri Kitayenko, Eduardo Mata, Anatoly Zatin, Kirill Kondrashin, and Krzysztof Penderecki. He has made numerous recordings for Melodiya, Pro Arte, Nonesuch, and Sony.

Audio samples

Sources
Vladimir Viardo | College of Music
Vladimir Viardo (Piano) - Short Biography

References

External links
Vladimir Viardo - Official Website Official Website

Living people
1949 births
Russian classical pianists
American classical pianists
Male classical pianists
American male pianists
Soviet emigrants to the United States
Gnessin State Musical College alumni
University of North Texas College of Music faculty
Moscow Conservatory alumni
Long-Thibaud-Crespin Competition prize-winners
Prize-winners of the Van Cliburn International Piano Competition
20th-century American pianists
21st-century classical pianists
20th-century American male musicians
21st-century American male musicians
21st-century American pianists